Canehill (also known as Cane Hill and Boonsboro) is an unincorporated community and census-designated place (CDP) in Washington County, Arkansas, United States. It was first listed as a CDP in the 2020 census with a population of 74.

The community is located in the Ozark Mountains on the outskirts of the Northwest Arkansas metropolitan area. One of the most historic communities in the state, Canehill contains seventeen listings on the National Register of Historic Places (NRHP). The Cane Hill College began operations in 1834, which led to the rapid growth and development of the community as a center of higher education. The college and community suffered during the American Civil War, and was bypassed by the railroad, which chose a route through Lincoln. Recently, restoration and preservation of many historic buildings has been undertaken by a nonprofit organization, Historic Cane Hill Inc.

Geography 
The post office at Canehill is located at  (35.9092280, -94.3967008) and is 1322 feet above sea level.

Considered a postal designation (ZIP code 72717), the population of the ZCTA was 847 at the 2000 census.

History

Cane Hill College
In 1834, the Cumberland Presbyterians established the first collegiate learning institute in Arkansas, naming it the Cane Hill School, after a nearby geological feature. The current Post Office was opened in 1839 and was originally unnamed. In 1843, it was named Boonsboro, and the town maintained this name throughout the American Civil War.

American Civil War

The year of 1862 brought the Battle of Cane Hill.

Postbellum years and decline

In 1897, the Cumberland Presbyterian Church considered Cane Hill College as the starting point for their "state" college. However, due to the nearby competition from Arkansas Industrial University, the decline of Cane Hill as a population center and its remote location, the Synod decided to open Arkansas Cumberland College in Clarksville, Arkansas, a more centralized location. In 1891, Cane Hill College closed its doors permanently. In 1901, the community's name was changed to the current usage, that of Canehill.

Economy
Early settlers were attracted to the area by natural springs, which were used in agricultural operations. The community served as a trading post and regional center for apple orchards to sell crops to merchants from Fort Smith. The locals also produced and sold sorghum, a tradition continuing today at the annual harvest festival.

Education
The community is served by the Lincoln Consolidated School District. Lincoln High School is its sole high school.

Demographics

2020 census

Note: the US Census treats Hispanic/Latino as an ethnic category. This table excludes Latinos from the racial categories and assigns them to a separate category. Hispanics/Latinos can be of any race.

Gallery

Notes

External links
The Battle of Cane Hill

Unincorporated communities in Washington County, Arkansas
Northwest Arkansas
Unincorporated communities in Arkansas
Census-designated places in Washington County, Arkansas
Census-designated places in Arkansas
Populated places established in 1834
1834 establishments in Arkansas Territory